Ashmore is a village and civil parish in the North Dorset district of Dorset, England,  southwest of Salisbury.

The village is centred on a circular pond and has a church and several stone cottages and farms, many with thatched roofs. It is the highest village in the county with the  contour passing close to the village church (although the north side of the town of Shaftesbury, Dorset, is slightly higher at ).

The pond or "mere" gave the village its original name of "Ash-mere".

In the 2011 census the parish had a population of 188.

History
Three round barrows have been found in the parish: two barrows south of the village near Well Bottom, and one west of the village near the boundary with the village of Fontmell Magna; this latter barrow was excavated in the 19th century and bones were recovered. Ashmore may have been the site of a Neolithic market place or settlement.

The Roman road from Bath to Badbury Rings passes through the east of the parish. The situation of the village is similar to Romano-British sites in the area, and there may have been a military camp and trading post in the area. It is possible that Ashmore may have been a Romano-British village that has been occupied without a break up to the present day; the parish church is sited West of the pond towards the edge of the village, which could indicate that the village pre-dated the church and Christianity.

It was in Cranborne Hundred and had a value of £15 to the lord of the manor, who was King William.

At the same time there was also a considerable area of enclosed fields, covering  in 1590.

Geography
The underlying geology is chalk, overlain by clay-with-flints in the south and southeast. All of Ashmore parish is within the Cranborne Chase and West Wiltshire Downs Area of Outstanding Natural Beauty (AONB).

Church and Chapel

The parish church of St. Nicholas is about 100 metres west of the village pond, west of High Street.  Its chancel arch is said to date from the 13th century and it was rebuilt in 1874.  On the opposite side of the High Street is a Wesleyan chapel which dates from 1855.

Demography
In the 2011 census the parish had 97 dwellings, 87 households and a population of 188.

In the first national census in 1891 the village had a population of 228.

Culture
In midsummer a celebration known as 'Filly Loo' (or 'Filleigh Loo') takes place around Ashmore pond, with a Green Man, country dancing, morris dancers and live music. The event's ancient origins are mysterious but may have pagan influences; theories include that it celebrated either the pond's constancy as a water supply, the summer solstice, or the end of the cultivated filbert (hazelnut) harvest. The meaning of the name 'Filly Loo' has also attracted more than one explanation, including that it is West Country dialect for 'uproar', a corruption of the French 'La Fille de l'Eau', ('maiden of the water'), or a corruption of 'Filbert Louis', a nickname of Louis Rideout, one of the historical instigators of the event. The event was revived in 1956 as a folk dance festival, and takes place on the Friday night nearest to Midsummer Day or the Feast of St. John the Baptist.

References

 Pitt-Rivers, Michael, 1968. Dorset. London: Faber & Faber.
 Taylor, Christopher, 1970. The Making of the Dorset Landscape. London: Hodder & Stoughton.

External links 
 
 The Dorset Page: Ashmore

Villages in Dorset